Néville-sur-Mer (literally Néville on Sea) is a former commune in the Manche department in Normandy in northwestern France. On 1 January 2016, it was merged into the new commune of Vicq-sur-Mer.

See also
Communes of the Manche department

References 

Nevillesurmer
Populated coastal places in France